Clare Hunt (born 12 March 1999) is an Australian soccer player who plays for Western Sydney Wanderers in the A-League Women. She has previously played for Canberra United.

Early life
Clare Hunt grew up in Grenfell, New South Wales. She joined the Canberra United Academy at 15.

Club career

Canberra United
In November 2016, Hunt made her debut for the club in a 5–2 win against Newcastle, coming off the bench in the 59th minute.

Western Sydney Wanderers
In December 2021, Hunt made her debut for A-League Women club Western Sydney Wanderers in a 0–0 draw with Wellington Phoenix.

References 

1999 births
Australian women's soccer players
Living people
Canberra United FC players
Western Sydney Wanderers FC (A-League Women) players
A-League Women players
Women's association football forwards
Sportswomen from New South Wales
Soccer players from New South Wales